Zhou Yongkang is a former senior leader of the Communist Party of China. It may also refer to:

 Charles Djou, American politician
See also:
 Alex Chow, Hong Kong social activist